Mattilo Manikyam is a 1971 Telugu drama film directed by B. V. Prasad. It is produced by actor Chalam. The film won National Film Award for Best Feature Film in Telugu in 1971.

Cast
P. Bhanumathi as Lalitha
 Chalam as Manikyam
 Jamuna as Lakshmi
Dhulipala as Mallayya
Prabhakar Reddy as Raghavaiah
 Padmanabham

Soundtrack
 "Saranam Nee Divya Charanam Nee Naamamento Madhuram" (Singer: Bhanumathi)
 "Malli Malli Padali Ee Paata" (Lyrics: Mylavarapu Gopi; Singer: P. Susheela)
 "Naa Maate Nee Maatai Chadavali" (Lyrics: Aathreya; Singers: S. P. Balasubrahmanyam and P. Susheela)
 "Rimjhim Rimjhim Hyderabad" (Lyrics: C. Narayana Reddy; Singer: S. P. Balasubrahmanyam)
 "Vasthe Istha Naa Moogamanasu" (Lyrics: RajasriSingers: Pithapuram Nageswara Rao and L. R. Eswari)
 "Palletoori Baithugadu" (Lyrics: Rajasri Singers: S. P. Balasubrahmanyam and P. Susheela)

References

External links 

 

1971 films
Indian black-and-white films
Films scored by Satyam (composer)
1970s Telugu-language films
Best Telugu Feature Film National Film Award winners